Tavistock Group is a Bahamas-based private investment organization founded by Joseph "Joe" Lewis in 1975. Lewis is the primary investor in the company. The company is headquartered in the offshore financial center of The Commonwealth of The Bahamas and has offices in 13 countries; Bahamas, UK, Australia, Canada, Mexico, US, Jamaica, Argentina, Poland, Moldova, Romania, Bulgaria, and Sri Lanka.

Investment portfolio 
With investments in hundreds of companies across 10 countries, Tavistock Group’s investment portfolio includes:

Sports & media: Tottenham Hotspur through the ENIC Group, and organizes sporting events such as the Tavistock Cup and the "Isleworth Collegiate Invitational". 
Finance: Ultimate Finance Group, Avenue Insurance Partners, 25 Capital Partners, RoundPoint 
Restaurants: Freebirds World Burrito and the Tavistock Restaurant Collection
Master-planned communities: "Lake Nona, Orlando, Florida", "Lake Nona Medical City, Orlando, Florida"
Resort properties: Lake Nona Golf & Country Club, Old Fort Bay, Albany, New Providence, Harmony Cove Jamaica, St. Regis Atlanta, Isleworth Golf & Country Club.
Life sciences: Boxer Capital
Oil, gas, and energy: American Renewables, BayCorp, NEO Energy USA, Pampa Energia, Transener.
Distribution & logistics: TopOutlet, Microdyn, Bulgarian Property Development, Condici, Gottex, TYR
Consumer goods: Saucony, Sperry Top-Sider, Alpinestars, Supra, Raleigh
Manufacturing: Vulkan Retail
Agriculture: Australian Agricultural Company Limited, Lago Escondido, Poland Land Co.
Vulture funds: Braslyn Ltd

Master planned communities

Lake Nona, Orlando, Florida 
Tavistock Group is the developer of Lake Nona, a multi-faceted, 17-square-mile (44 km2, 10,900 acre, 4,400 hectare) mixed-use development in southeast Orlando. This large-scale community was designed to host education, medical and recreational facilities, a life sciences cluster, diverse workspaces, and a range of residential options. 

The centerpiece of the community is Lake Nona Medical City—which includes the University of Central Florida College of Medicine and the Sanford-Burnham Medical Research Institute, the University of Florida Academic and Research Center, Nemours Children’s Hospital, and the Orlando Veterans Affairs Medical Center.

Resort properties & private clubs

Albany, New Providence 
Other luxury resort properties include Albany on the island of New Providence in the Bahamas designed in conjunction with Tiger Woods and Ernie Els. This luxury beach resort community (opened in October 2010) features an Els-designed 18-hole championship golf course and a 71-slip mega-yacht marina flanked by luxury residences designed by noted architects, including the late Charles Gwathmey and Robert A.M. Stern.

St. Regis Atlanta 
Tavistock Group owns the St. Regis Atlanta, a 26-floor development with 151 guest rooms and suites and 53 residences located in Atlanta's Buckhead community.

Harmony Cove, Jamaica 
Tavistock Group has partnered with the Jamaican government’s Harmonization Ltd. to jointly plan and develop 2,350 oceanfront acres on the country’s northern coast into Harmony Cove, a new resort destination category for Jamaica. Harmony Cove is situated 30 minutes from Montego Bay and Ocho Rios in Trelawny Parish and will offer luxury accommodations, championship golf courses, a casino, and an assortment of shopping and dining choices.

Lake Nona Wave Hotel, Orlando 
The Lake Nona Wave Hotel has been called “the most technologically advanced hotel in the world,” and for good reason. Opened in December 2021, each of the 234 rooms—including the 16 one-bedroom suites and two penthouses—runs on a digital concierge. In-room voice commands control the smart lighting and temperature controls, and the smart-glass windows dynamically block 99% of UV light throughout the day.

As a whole, the upscale lifestyle hotel features an artwork collection of more than 500 pieces; two restaurants – Bacán and HAVEN – and Living Room Bar; swimming pool; technogym-powered fitness studio; 42-foot rock-climbing tower; and access to the first-ever Dr. Deepak Chopra’s Mind-Body Zone and Spa.

Restaurants

Tavistock Restaurant Collection 
Tavistock Restaurant Collection (TRC) is a family of upscale dining brands, including Abe & Louie's, Atlantic Fish, Atlas, Blackhawk Grille, Boxi Park, Cafe del Rey, Cañonita, Canvas Restaurant & Market, Chroma Modern Bar + Kitchen, Coach Grill, Joe's American Bar & Grill, Napa Valley Grille, Park Pizza & Brewing Company, Timpano, and ZED451. TRC incorporates multiple concepts in its range—steakhouse, pizza, seafood, Italian, and modern American fare. All locations offer wine selections from the private wine label Tavistock Reserve Collection.

Freebirds World Burrito 
Freebirds World Burrito is an Austin, TX, based restaurant concept under Tavistock Group but is not included in the Tavistock Restaurant Collection.

See also
 ENIC Group
 Tottenham Hotspur 
 Joseph "Joe" Lewis
 Daniel Levy (businessman)

References

External links 

 Tavistock Group (company website)
 St Regis Atlanta Residences (company website)
 Isleworth

 
Financial services companies established in 1975
Private equity firms of the United States
Companies based in Orange County, Florida
Sports holding companies
Offshore finance